Heukewalde is a German municipality in the Thuringian Landkreis of Altenburger Land.  It belongs to the Verwaltungsgemeinschaft of Oberes Sprottental.

Geography

Neighboring Municipalities
Communities near Heukewalde include:  Jonaswalde, Posterstein, and Vollmershain in the Landkreis of Altenburger Land; as well as Rückersdorf und Paitzdorf in the Landkreis of  Greiz.

History
Heukewalde was first mentioned in writing on December 9, 1152.  From 1826 to 1920, it belonged to Saxe-Altenburg.

Mayors
Bernhard Göpel, mayor from 1892 to 1917.

External links
 A Heukewalde Chronicle (coat of arms)

References

Altenburger Land
Duchy of Saxe-Altenburg

mk:Хојкевалде